The Clouère is a river that flows  through the west-central French departments of Charente and Vienne. Its source is at Lessac, from which it flows generally northwest. It is a right tributary of the Clain, into which it flows between Château-Larcher and Aslonnes.

Communes
Th Clouère flows through these communes, listed from source to mouth: 
Charente: Lessac 
Vienne: Availles-Limouzine, Pressac, Saint-Martin-l'Ars, Usson-du-Poitou, Saint-Secondin, Brion, Saint-Maurice-la-Clouère, Gençay, Marnay, Château-Larcher, Aslonnes

References

Rivers of France
Rivers of Charente
Rivers of Vienne
Rivers of Nouvelle-Aquitaine